The third generation (Generation III) of the Pokémon franchise features 135 fictional species of creatures introduced to the core video game series in the 2002 Game Boy Advance games Pokémon Ruby and Sapphire. Some Pokémon in this generation were introduced in animated adaptations of the franchise before Ruby and Sapphire.

The following list details the 135 Pokémon of Generation III in order of their National Pokédex number. The first Pokémon, Treecko, is number 252 and the last, Deoxys, is number 386. Alternate forms that result in type changes are included for convenience. Mega evolutions and regional forms are included on the pages for the generation in which they were introduced.

Design and development
Nintendo Life noted in a retrospective that the third generation of Pokémon has a very different "feel" from the two generations that came before it because almost all of its 135 new Pokémon – save for Azurill and Wynaut – have no relation to those of the previous generations. Ruby and Sapphire features two "Mythical Pokémon" – Jirachi and Deoxys – both of which became available to coincide with their respective anime movies.

Pokémon Ruby and Sapphire significantly increased the amount of "Dark" and "Steel"-type Pokémon in the series, as only a few Pokémon in previous generations used these typings. Hardcore Gamer also noted that many of the new Pokémon made use of "dual typing", where Pokémon have both a primary and a secondary type; this wasn't nearly as common in Red and Blue or Gold and Silver.

List of Pokémon

 Treecko
 Grovyle
 Sceptile
 Torchic
 Combusken
 Blaziken
 Mudkip
 Marshtomp
 Swampert
 Poochyena
 Mightyena
 Zigzagoon
 Linoone
 Wurmple
 Silcoon
 Beautifly
 Cascoon
 Dustox
 Lotad
 Lombre
 Ludicolo
 Seedot
 Nuzleaf
 Shiftry
 Taillow
 Swellow
 Wingull
 Pelipper
 Ralts
 Kirlia
 Gardevoir
 Surskit
 Masquerain
 Shroomish
 Breloom
 Slakoth
 Vigoroth
 Slaking
 Nincada
 Ninjask
 Shedinja
 Whismur
 Loudred
 Exploud
 Makuhita
 Hariyama
 Azurill
 Nosepass
 Skitty
 Delcatty
 Sableye
 Mawile
 Aron
 Lairon
 Aggron
 Meditite
 Medicham
 Electrike
 Manectric
 Plusle
 Minun
 Volbeat
 Illumise
 Roselia
 Gulpin
 Swalot
 Carvanha
 Sharpedo
 Wailmer
 Wailord
 Numel
 Camerupt
 Torkoal
 Spoink
 Grumpig
 Spinda
 Trapinch
 Vibrava
 Flygon
 Cacnea
 Cacturne
 Swablu
 Altaria
 Zangoose
 Seviper
 Lunatone
 Solrock
 Barboach
 Whiscash
 Corphish
 Crawdaunt
 Baltoy
 Claydol
 Lileep
 Cradily
 Anorith
 Armaldo
 Feebas
 Milotic
 Castform
 Kecleon
 Shuppet
 Banette
 Duskull
 Dusclops
 Tropius
 Chimecho
 Absol
 Wynaut
 Snorunt
 Glalie
 Spheal
 Sealeo
 Walrein
 Clamperl
 Huntail
 Gorebyss
 Relicanth
 Luvdisc
 Bagon
 Shelgon
 Salamence
 Beldum
 Metang
 Metagross
 Regirock
 Regice
 Registeel
 Latias
 Latios
 Kyogre
 Groudon
 Rayquaza
 Jirachi
 Deoxys

Reception
Reception to Generation III's Pokémon has been polarising. Alex Carlson of Hardcore Gamer wrote in 2014 that the third generation of Pokémon games was not well received by fans of the series, with some people calling the generation the "worst in the series history". This was in part because Ruby and Sapphire did not allow players to transfer in their Pokémon from previous generations and, because of this, many older Pokémon were completely unavailable in the games until Pokémon FireRed and LeafGreen were released a few years later. Meanwhile, many of the new Pokémon designs, such as those for Torchic, Feebas, Luvdisc, Castform and Clamperl, were criticised for being unoriginal. Contrastingly, some designs, including Breloom, Aggron, and the aforementioned Castform were praised for their coolness, with the large variety of unique legendary Pokémon also helping the third generation feel fresh and new. While Ruby and Sapphire were recognized for introducing less memorable designs than their predecessors, designs like Milotic, Salamence, Metagross, Rayquaza, and Blaziken made the overall generation a satisfying supplement to the existing Pokédex.

The third generation has had its share of enduringly popular designs. Eighteen years after the release of Ruby and Sapphire, Rayquaza and Gardevoir finished eighth and ninth in 2020's Pokémon of the Year vote, with Flygon, Sceptile, and Blaziken also among the top 30. Rayquaza also finished eighth in a 2016 Japanese poll, with Jirachi and Kyogre among the top 25. A popularity vote on the Pokémon subreddit featured Blaziken at 5th, joined in the top 25 by Gardevoir, Absol, Flygon, and Mudkip.

Notes

References

Lists of Pokémon
Video game characters introduced in 2002